The City of Toowoomba was a local government area in the Darling Downs region of Queensland, Australia, encompassing the centre and inner suburbs of the regional city of Toowoomba.

History 
The Borough of Toowoomba was proclaimed on 19 November 1860 under the Municipalities Act 1858, a piece of New South Wales legislation inherited by Queensland when it became a separate colony in 1859. William Henry Groom, sometimes described as the "father of Toowoomba", was elected its first mayor. It achieved a measure of autonomy in 1878 with the enactment of the Local Government Act. With the passage of the Local Authorities Act 1902, Toowoomba Municipality became the Town of Toowoomba on 31 March 1903. On 29 October 1904, Toowoomba was proclaimed the City of Toowoomba.

Toowoomba absorbed parts of the Shire of Middle Ridge and Town of Newtown on 23 February 1917.

On 19 March 1949, following a major reorganisation of local government in South East Queensland, Toowoomba grew its area to include parts of the Shires of Highfields and Drayton.

In 2006 the Mayor Dianne Thorley proposed a controversial plan to recycle sewage into Cooby Dam which is used for drinking water. The federal government agreed to provide partial funding subject to a number of conditions including a requirement to hold a referendum on the issue.  On 29 July 2006, Toowoomba voted against the recycled sewage project with the 'No' vote winning by 62% to 38%.

On 15 March 2008, under the Local Government (Reform Implementation) Act 2007 passed by the Parliament of Queensland on 10 August 2007, the City of Toowoomba merged with the Shires of Cambooya, Clifton, Crows Nest, Jondaryan, Millmerran, Pittsworth and Shire of Rosalie to form the Toowoomba Region. The former mayor of the Shire of Jondaryan won the mayoralty of the new council.

Suburbs 
The City of Toowoomba included the following settlements:

 Blue Mountain Heights1
 Centenary Heights
 Cotswold Hills2
 Cranley
 Darling Heights
 Drayton
 East Toowoomba
 Glenvale2
 Harlaxton

 Harristown
 Highfields1
 Kearneys Spring
 Middle Ridge
 Mount Kynoch
 Mount Lofty
 Newtown
 North Toowoomba
 Prince Henry Heights

 Rangeville
 Redwood
 Rockville
 South Toowoomba
 Toowoomba City
 Torrington2
 Wilsonton
 Wilsonton Heights

1 - split with the former Shire of Crows Nest
2 - split with the former Shire of Jondaryan

Population

Mayors

 List of mayors of Toowoomba

References

 
Darling Downs
Toowoomba, City of
Former local government areas of Queensland
1860 establishments in Australia
2008 disestablishments in Australia
Populated places disestablished in 2008